Halton Borough Council elections are generally held three years out of every four, with a third of the council being elected each time. Halton Borough Council is the local authority for the unitary authority of Halton in Cheshire, England. Since the last boundary changes in 2020, 54 councillors have been elected from 18 wards.

Political control
Halton was created under the Local Government Act 1972 as a non-metropolitan district, with Cheshire County Council providing county-level services. The first election to the district council was held in 1973, initially operating as a shadow authority before coming into its powers on 1 April 1974. On 1 April 1998 Halton became a unitary authority, becoming independent from Cheshire County Council. Political control of Halton since 1974 has been held by the following parties:

Non-metropolitan district

Unitary authority

Leadership
The first leader of the council, John Collins, had been the last leader of the Widnes Borough Council, one of the council's predecessors. The leaders of the council since 1974 have been:

Council elections
1973 Halton Borough Council election
1976 Halton Borough Council election (New ward boundaries)
1979 Halton Borough Council election
1980 Halton Borough Council election
1982 Halton Borough Council election
1983 Halton Borough Council election
1984 Halton Borough Council election
1986 Halton Borough Council election (New ward boundaries)
1987 Halton Borough Council election
1988 Halton Borough Council election
1990 Halton Borough Council election
1991 Halton Borough Council election
1992 Halton Borough Council election
1994 Halton Borough Council election (Borough boundary changes took place but the number of seats remained the same)
1995 Halton Borough Council election
1996 Halton Borough Council election
1997 Halton Borough Council election (New ward boundaries)
1999 Halton Borough Council election
2000 Halton Borough Council election
2001 Halton Borough Council election
2002 Halton Borough Council election
2004 Halton Borough Council election (New ward boundaries)
2006 Halton Borough Council election
2007 Halton Borough Council election
2008 Halton Borough Council election
2010 Halton Borough Council election
2011 Halton Borough Council election
2012 Halton Borough Council election
2014 Halton Borough Council election
2015 Halton Borough Council election
2016 Halton Borough Council election
2018 Halton Borough Council election
2019 Halton Borough Council election
2021 Halton Borough Council election (New ward boundaries)
2022 Halton Borough Council election

By-election results

References

External links
Halton Council
By-election results 

 
Borough of Halton
Council elections in Cheshire
Unitary authority elections in England
District council elections in England